House Party 3 is a 1994 American comedy film, starring Kid 'n Play, Bernie Mac, and TLC. It is the third installment of the House Party film series. This was intended to be the last film in the franchise, ending it as a trilogy, but a stand-alone direct to video sequel, House Party 4: Down to the Last Minute, was released six years later. This is also Chris Tucker's debut on film as well as the first film in the series that Martin Lawrence does not reprise his role as Bilal, nor was he mentioned. Also absent in House Party 3 are three of the members of the R&B group Full Force, who played the bullies in the first two films.

Plot
Christopher, a.k.a. Kid is marrying his girlfriend Veda, while his best friend Peter, a.k.a. Play is dipping his fingers into the music business and attempting to manage a roughneck female rap act called Sex as a Weapon. Play books the ladies for a concert with heavy-hitting promoter Showboat, but when they decide to fire Play and hire a new manager, he has to figure out how to deliver them to the show or face the wrath of Showboat's female security force. Kid and Play talk about their dream to one day open a store to sell their favorite sandwich.

Things eventually begin to spiral out of control for the two, as Play is also planning the bachelor party while trying to keep Kid's three younger cousins from Detroit (who ironically call themselves Immature) in line, and Kid's ex-girlfriend Sydney has come back to town, which is news that doesn't please Veda at all. To complicate matters more Kid's cousins hijack his bachelor party in retaliation for not letting them perform at it (moving it from the rented hotel ballroom to their Aunt Lucy's house) The party at the ballroom is a bust as Play's cousin Stinky invites very obese women to the party (he's attracted to heavyset women). Meanwhile, Showboat has been out looking for Kid & Play for his money but gets sidetracked briefly by Kid's mischievous cousins. Embarrassed by the poor turnout at his party Kid bails into the corridor and runs into Sydney (who is there for her grandparents' anniversary party). Sydney congratulates Kid and tells him that Veda is good for him. As they hug and part ways Veda comes out of the elevator and sees them hugging. She immediately jumps to the conclusion that Kid slept with her but her Cousin Janelle (who had been dogging Kid and the pending marriage throughout the film) comes to his defense and tell Veda she is wrong to assume Kid cheated. At the same time Play (who also disagreed with Kid getting married) tells Kid he is wrong for wanting to break off the marriage since he's convinced Veda doesn't trust him.

After Kid and Veda make up they get a phone call from Kid's Uncle Vester about the party Immature is throwing and head back to his Aunt Lucy's house to find an out of control party in progress (unbeknownst to Aunt Lucy who was up in her room). Just as Kid starts to curse his cousins out Play stops him and convinces him to celebrate his bachelor party here. At that moment Showboat arrives with his female hitmen and are about to attack Kid & Play when he hears Kid's cousins performing at the party, Kid picks up on this and immediately informs Showboat that they were a new act he and Play were working on. Sex as a Weapon arrives and tells Showboat that they didn't like what was done to the three blind rappers earlier in the film (they were stiffed on the pay for a show) so they opted to come back to Kid & Play giving Showboat two new acts instead of just one. Showboat  pays up and everything is seemingly coming back into their control. Even Immature knows how much of an irritation they were so in that resolve they opt to give Kid half of the cash from the party. This cash, however is taken by Aunt Lucy who revealed that she knew all along that there was a party going on and that the money would be just enough to clean her house after it was over. After the drama has settled, Kid & Play enjoy the party and perform one last time together rapping to the crowd along with Sex as A Weapon.

The next day Kid and Veda finally tie the knot. Play gifts Kid with a brand new Jeep, telling him that their production company is going to be huge. He accepts the Jeep as he and Veda ride off into the sunset.

Cast

Music

Soundtrack

A soundtrack containing hip hop and R&B music was released in January 1994 by Select Records. It peaked at 55 on the Top R&B/Hip-Hop Albums. The soundtrack is notable for containing the last original material released by the film's stars, Kid 'n Play.

Reception

Box office
The film opened on Wednesday, January 12, 1994 in 848 theaters and despite the poor reviews and low expectations, finished third at the US box office over the Martin Luther King Jr. Day weekend with a 4-day weekend gross of $6,850,010, exceeding the openings of the first two films. It went on to gross $19,281,235 in the United States and Canada

Critical response
The film had lackluster reviews. Rotten Tomatoes gives the film 0% score based on reviews from 10 critics.

Year-end lists
 Dishonorable mention – Dan Craft, The Pantagraph

Sequels
In 2001 House Party 4: Down to the Last Minute was released direct to video, however it serves as a standalone film as no characters, cast and crew members from the previous installments were in the film. 12 years later in 2013, a fifth installment in the series, titled House Party: Tonight's the Night, was released by Warner Premiere in 2013 and serves as a direct sequel to House Party 3, unrelated to the events of House Party 4 and features the return of Kid 'n Play, reprising their roles from the first three films.

References

External links
 
 
 

1994 films
1994 independent films
1990s musical comedy films
1994 romantic comedy films
1990s buddy comedy films
1990s teen comedy films
1990s teen romance films
African-American films
American buddy comedy films
American independent films
American musical comedy films
American romantic comedy films
American romantic musical films
American sequel films
American teen comedy films
American teen romance films
1990s hip hop films
House Party films
New Line Cinema films
1994 directorial debut films
1990s English-language films
1990s American films